The 2016–17 Tennessee Lady Volunteers basketball team represented the University of Tennessee in the 2016–17 college basketball season. The Lady Vols, led by 5th year head coach Holly Warlick, play their games at Thompson–Boling Arena and were members of the Southeastern Conference. They finished the season 20–12, 10–6 in SEC play to finish in fifth place. They lost in the second round of the SEC women's tournament to Alabama. They received an at-large to the NCAA women's tournament where they defeated Dayton in the first round before losing to Louisville in the second round.

Roster

Rankings

Schedule and Results

|-
!colspan=9 style="background:#F77F00; color:white;"| Exhibition

|-
!colspan=9 style="background:#F77F00; color:white;"| Regular season

|-
!colspan=9 style="background:#F77F00;"| SEC Women's Tournament

|-
!colspan=9 style="background:#F77F00;"| NCAA Women's Tournament

Source:

See also
 2016–17 Tennessee Volunteers basketball team

References

Tennessee
Tennessee Lady Volunteers basketball seasons
Volunteers
Tennessee
Volunteers